Rizomylos (Greek: Ριζόμυλος meaning rice mill) may refer to several places in Greece:

Rizomylos, Achaea, a village in the municipal unit of Diakopto, Achaea
Rizomylos, Magnesia a village in the municipal unit of Karla, Magnesia